Sir Paul Meernaa Caedwalla Hasluck,  (1 April 1905 – 9 January 1993) was an Australian statesman who served as the 17th Governor-General of Australia, in office from 1969 to 1974. Prior to that, he was a Liberal Party politician, holding ministerial office continuously from 1951 to 1969.

Hasluck was born in Fremantle, Western Australia, and attended Perth Modern School and the University of Western Australia. After graduation he joined the university as a faculty member, eventually becoming a reader in history. Hasluck joined the Department of External Affairs during World War II, and served as Australia's first Permanent Representative to the United Nations from 1946 to 1947. He would later contribute two volumes to Australia in the War of 1939–1945, the official history of Australia's involvement in the war.

In 1949, Hasluck was elected to federal parliament for the Liberal Party, winning the Division of Curtin. In 1951, less than two years after entering politics, he was made Minister for Territories in the Menzies Government. In his twelve years in the position, he initiated transitions toward self-government in Australia's territories, including Nauru, Papua New Guinea, and the Northern Territory. Hasluck later served as Minister for Defence (1963–1964) and Minister for External Affairs (1964–1969). His tenure in those positions covered Australia's involvement in the Indonesia–Malaysia confrontation and the first years of the Vietnam War.

After the disappearance of Harold Holt, Hasluck unsuccessfully stood in the resulting Liberal leadership election. He initially stayed on in cabinet under the new prime minister, John Gorton, but in 1969 Gorton instead nominated him to replace Lord Casey as governor-general. In his five years in the position, Hasluck saw two previous political adversaries (William McMahon and Gough Whitlam) become prime minister; he maintained good working relationships with both. In retirement, he was a prolific author, publishing an autobiography, several volumes of poetry, and multiple works on Australian history.

Early life
Hasluck was born in Fremantle, Western Australia, the son of Patience Eliza (née Wooler) and E'thel Meernaa Caedwalla Hasluck. His father was born in Essex, England, and his mother was born in London; both were Salvation Army officers. Hasluck spent his early years in Collie, where his father ran a boys' home, and attended a one-room school there. His parents later moved to Guildford, where they ran a nursing home, Riversleigh House, that was "the first non-government home for aged men in Western Australia". Hasluck won a scholarship to Perth Modern School, which he attended from 1918 to 1922. He later attended Perth's sole campus at the time, the University of Western Australia, where he graduated with an initial diploma in journalism and later a Master of Arts degree.

While still a student, Hasluck joined the literary staff of Perth's main newspaper, The West Australian; he also began to publish articles (in that journal and elsewhere) on the history of the state. After he had obtained his MA, he worked as a tutor in the UWA's history department, and in 1939 he was promoted to a lectureship in history. By that time he had been married for seven years to Alexandra Darker (1908–1993), with whom he had two sons. Alexandra Hasluck became a distinguished writer and historian in her own right, and was the first woman to be appointed a Dame of the Order of Australia.

Also in 1939, Hasluck established Freshwater Bay Press, through which he released his first book, Into the Desert. The advent of the Second World War, however, saw the publishing company go into hiatus. The Freshwater Bay Press was later revived by his son Nicholas, and among its subsequent publications it issued a second book of Paul Hasluck's poetry, Dark Cottage in 1984.

In 1941 Hasluck was recruited to the staff of the Department of External Affairs (it acquired the name "Foreign Affairs" only in 1970), and served on Australian delegations to several international conferences, including the San Francisco Conference which founded the United Nations. Here he came into close contact with the Minister for External Affairs in the Labor government, Dr H.V. Evatt, towards whom he conceived a permanent aversion, fully reciprocated by Evatt's attitude to him.

After the war Hasluck returned to the University of Western Australia as a Reader in History, and was commissioned to write two volumes of Australia in the War of 1939–1945, a 22-volume official history of Australia's involvement in World War II. These volumes were published as The Government and the People 1939–1941 in 1951 and The Government and the People 1941–1945 in 1970. This work was interrupted by his decision to enter politics, a decision motivated partly by his disapproval of Evatt's foreign policy.

Political career

At the 1949 election Hasluck won Liberal preselection for the newly-created Perth-area seat of Curtin.  Although it was notionally a Labor seat, it was located in natural Liberal territory in Perth's wealthy beachside suburbs, and Hasluck won it with a resounding swing of almost 14 percent as part of the Coalition's large victory that year.

In 1951, Prime Minister, Robert Menzies appointed Hasluck as Minister for Territories, a post that he held for twelve years. It gave him responsibility for Australia's colonial possession, Papua New Guinea, and also the Northern Territory, home to Australia's largest population of Aboriginals. Although he shared the paternalistic views of the period about the treatment of the Papua New Guineans and followed an assimilationist policy for Aboriginals he carried out significant reforms in how both peoples were treated.

Hasluck was responsible for the drafting of the bill that became the Welfare Ordinance 1953, which superseded the previous legislation controlling the lives of Aboriginals in the Northern Territory, the Aboriginals Ordinance 1918. There was no explicit reference to race in the Welfare Ordinance, but it made Aboriginals wards of the state. Wards were defined as those who did not have the right to vote, which only applied to Aboriginals.

Michael Somare, who became Papua New Guinea's first Prime Minister, said that his country had been able to enter self-government without fear of having to argue with an Ian Smith "simply because of Paul Hasluck".

Hasluck was briefly Minister for Defence in 1963 and 1964, and then became Minister for External Affairs. He held the office during the height of Australia's commitment to the Vietnam War of which he was a passionate supporter. He worked to strengthen Australia's relationship with the United States and with anticommunist governments in South-East Asia and opposed Australian recognition of the People's Republic of China.

Leadership candidate

When Prime Minister Harold Holt disappeared in December 1967 and was presumed to have drowned, Hasluck was determined that Treasurer, William McMahon, of whom he had a very low opinion, should not become prime minister. Although he had no great ambitions for himself, Hasluck put his name forward mainly to provide an alternative to McMahon. In the event, McMahon did not stand, as the interim prime minister, John McEwen, had advised his Country Party would not serve in any government headed by McMahon. The choice was between Hasluck, John Gorton, Billy Snedden and Les Bury, but the last two were never considered serious contenders. Many Liberal MPs saw Hasluck as too old at 64, too conservative and insufficiently telegenic to compete with the Labor leader, Gough Whitlam. Accordingly, they chose the younger and more aggressive Gorton.

Governor-General

In early 1969, Gorton offered Hasluck the post of Governor-General, which he accepted. Reportedly, Gorton was uncomfortable having a potential leadership rival in Cabinet. Hasluck resigned from Parliament on 10 February 1969, being the first Western Australian member of the House of Representatives to resign. He was sworn in as Governor-General on 30 April 1969. That may have cost Hasluck a second opportunity to become Prime Minister. Gorton was forced to resign in 1971, and the Liberals might well have turned to Hasluck instead of McMahon if he had still been available.

At the 1972 election, Whitlam defeated McMahon and became Prime Minister. That created a potentially-awkward situation since Whitlam and Hasluck had bitterly resented one another for years. In a celebrated incident in the House of Representatives in 1965, Whitlam had thrown a glass of water at Hasluck after Hasluck had said, "You are one of the filthiest objects ever to come into this chamber". Improbably enough in view, Hasluck and Whitlam treated each other with complete civility, which soon became genuine mutual respect. They had no difficulties in their formal dealings. An indication of the change that had taken place occurred soon after Whitlam's victory. Normal practice called for McMahon to stay on as caretaker Prime Minister until Labor could choose a full ministry at its first caucus meeting. However, Whitlam was unwilling to wait that long and asked Hasluck to have Whitlam and his deputy leader, Lance Barnard, sworn in as an interim two-man government once Labor's victory was beyond doubt. Hasluck promptly agreed, and Whitlam and Barnard held 27 portfolios between them until the full Labor ministry was sworn in.

In 1973, Hasluck's Official Secretary, Sir Murray Tyrrell, retired after a career during which he had served six governors-general over 26 years. He was succeeded by David Smith.

Hasluck granted Whitlam a double dissolution in April 1974 (with an election on 18 May) when the Liberal Opposition threatened to block the Budget bills in the Senate. Hasluck's term as Governor-General was due to expire in July 1974. Whitlam had offered to extend his term, but Hasluck declined, citing his wife's refusal to remain at Yarralumla longer than the originally-agreed five years.

Hasluck's last official act as Governor-General was to open the 29th Parliament on 9 July 1974. Two days later, his successor, Sir John Kerr, was sworn in.

Retirement and legacy 
Hasluck retired to Perth, where he remained active in cultural and political affairs until his death in 1993. He was buried at Karrakatta Cemetery.

Historians of the period are certain that, if Hasluck had still been Governor-General in 1975, the constitutional crisis of that year would have ended differently. Hasluck himself implied this in his 1979 book, The Office of Governor-General, and also in the Queale Lecture. He was even more explicit in his 1985 interview with Clyde Cameron for the National Library of Australia's Oral History series, which was not released until 2010. He said he doubted he would have discussed with anyone but Whitlam the Senate's 1975 refusal to approve Supply. He also argued that Kerr erred in taking advice from Malcolm Fraser prior to appointing him as prime minister. In Hasluck's view, "the function of the governor-general is not to be the honest broker in political situations".

After Hasluck's death, his son Nicholas Hasluck published a selection of his father's private journals and notebooks, under the title The Chance of Politics. This book contained a number of highly critical comments, both political and personal, about many of Paul Hasluck's contemporaries. The publication of this material caused considerable offence to some people. Others saw the comments as useful historical information.

Set into the footpath along St Georges Terrace, Perth are 150 bronze tablets commemorating notable figures in Western Australia's history, completed as part of WAY 1979. One of the tablets is devoted to Hasluck.

His heraldic banner as Knight of the Garter, from St George's Chapel, Windsor Castle, probably the only one in Australia, was hung in the south transept of St George's Cathedral, Perth, in 1995. The Catherine wheels on the banner were taken from the Armorial Bearings granted to him by the College of Arms. The crest beneath the banner includes the seven-pointed Australian Commonwealth Star and a formalised representation of West Australian Xanthorrhoea.

Honours
Hasluck was appointed a Privy Counsellor in 1966. On 21 February 1969, as Governor-General-designate, he was appointed a Knight Grand Cross of the Order of St Michael and St George (GCMG).

During his term as Governor-General, on 29 May 1970, Queen Elizabeth II appointed him a Knight Grand Cross of the Royal Victorian Order (GCVO), an appointment within her personal gift.

Hasluck received the Commemorative Medal of the 2500th Anniversary of the founding of the Persian Empire on 14 October 1971.

On 24 April 1979, he was made a Knight of the Order of the Garter (KG).

The Federal Division of Hasluck is named jointly after Sir Paul and his wife Dame Alexandra Hasluck.

Bibliography

Poetry

 Collected Verse, Hawthorn Press, 1969.
 An Open Go, Hawthorn Press, 1971.
 The Poet in Australia, Hawthorn Press, 1975.
 Dark Cottage (poems), Freshwater Bay Press, 1984.

Political writing
 Black Australians: A Survey of Native Policy in Western Australia, 1829–1897, Melbourne University Press (Melbourne), 1942, 2nd edition, 1970.
 Workshop of Security, F. W. Cheshire, 1948.
 The Government and the People, Australian War Memorial, Volume I: 1939–41, 1951, Volume II: 1942–45, 1970.
 Native Welfare in Australia, P. Brokensha, 1953.
 A Time for Building: Australian Administration in Papua-New Guinea, 1951–1963, Melbourne University Press, 1976.
 The Office of Governor-General, (PDF) Melbourne University Press, 1979.
 Sir Robert Menzies, Melbourne University Press, 1980.
 Diplomatic Witness: Australian Foreign Affairs, Melbourne University Press, 1980.
 Shades of Darkness: Aboriginal Affairs, 1925–1965, Melbourne University Press, 1988.
 The Chance of Politics, edited by Nicholas Hasluck, Text Pub. (Melbourne), 1997

Biographical
 Mucking About: An Autobiography, Melbourne University Press, 1977, published with a new foreword, University of Western Australia (Nedlands, Australia), 1994.
 Light That Time Has Made, National Library of Australia (Canberra), 1995.

Critical studies and reviews
 Review of Light that time has made.
Peter Ryan, Brief Lives, Duffy & Snellgrove, Sydney, 2004, "Paul Hasluck", pp. 91–104.

Notes

Further reading

 Hasluck, Paul (1942), Black Australians, Melbourne University Press.
 Hasluck, Paul (1988), Shades of Darkness: Aboriginal Affairs 1925–1965, Melbourne University Press.
 Hasluck, Paul (1994), Mucking About: An Autobiography, University of Western Australia Press.
 Hasluck, Paul (1997), The Chance of Politics (edited by Nicholas Hasluck), Text Publishing.
 "Three Governors-General: Hasluck, Kerr, Cowen" in Donald Markwell (2016), Constitutional Conventions and the Headship of State: Australian Experience, Connor Court. 
 Porter, Robert (1993), Paul Hasluck: A Political Biography, University of Western Australia Press.

External links
 Paul Hasluck's Australian theatre credits at AusStage

University of Western Australia alumni
1905 births
1993 deaths
Australian people of English descent
Australian ministers for Foreign Affairs
Burials at Karrakatta Cemetery
Governors-General of Australia
Historians from Western Australia
Australian Knights of the Garter
Australian Knights Grand Cross of the Order of St Michael and St George
Australian Knights Grand Cross of the Royal Victorian Order
Australian politicians awarded knighthoods
Liberal Party of Australia members of the Parliament of Australia
Members of the Australian House of Representatives for Curtin
Members of the Cabinet of Australia
People educated at Perth Modern School
People from Fremantle
Writers from Perth, Western Australia
20th-century Australian historians
Defence ministers of Australia
The West Australian
20th-century Australian politicians
20th-century Australian public servants
Australian members of the Privy Council of the United Kingdom
Australian memoirists
Australian monarchists
20th-century memoirists